Stefano Musco is a Grand Prix motorcycle racer from Italy.

Career statistics

By season

Races by year
(key)

References

External links
 Profile on motogp.com

Italian motorcycle racers
Living people
1989 births
125cc World Championship riders
People from Spoleto
Sportspeople from the Province of Perugia